David (abu Sulaiman) ibn Merwan al-Mukkamas al-Rakki ( translit.: Dawud ibn Marwan al-Muqamis; died c. 937) was a philosopher and controversialist, the author of the earliest known Jewish philosophical work of the Middle Ages. He was a native of Raqqa, Mesopotamia, whence his surname. Harkavy derives his byname from the Arabic "ḳammaṣ" (to leap), interpreting it as referring to his asserted change of faith (Grätz, Gesch. Hebr. transl., iii.498). This is uncertain. The name is written "אלקומסי" in Masudi's Al-Tanbih (ed. De Goeje, p. 113), in a Karaitic commentary to Leviticus, and in a manuscript copy of Jefeth's commentary to the same book (Jew. Quart. Rev. viii.681), and is perhaps a derivative from the city of Ḳumis in Taberistan (Yaḳut, iv.203). Another Karaite bears the name "Daniel al-Ḳumisi," and in Al-Hiti's chronicle this name is also spelled with a ẓade (Jew. Quart. Rev. ix.432).

Polemical works 
David, the father of Jewish philosophy, was almost unknown until the latter part of the 19th century. The publication of Judah Barzilai's commentary to the Sefer Yezirah (Meḳiẓe Nirdamim, 1885), in which is found a poor Hebrew translation of the ninth and tenth chapters of David's philosophical work, first brought the latter into notice. Barzilai says that he does not know whether David was one of the Geonim, but claims to have heard that Saadia had known him and had profited by his lessons. Pinsker and Grätz, confounding him with Daniel ha-Babli of Cairo, make him a Mohammedan convert to Karaism, on the ground that he is quoted by Karaite scholars, and is called by Hadasi "ger ẓedeḳ" (pious proselyte).

The discovery by Harkavy of the Kitab al-Riyaḍ wal-Ḥada'iḳ, by the Karaite Al-Ḳirḳisani, threw further light on David. Al-Ḳirḳisani cites a work by him on the various Jewish sects, and says that David had "embraced Christianity" (tanaṣṣar), that he was for many years the pupil of a renowned Christian physician and philosopher named Hana, and that, after acquiring considerable knowledge of philosophy, he wrote two works against Christianity which became famous. But it seems more probable that the word "tanaṣṣar" means simply that David had intercourse with Christians. Ḳirḳisani, indeed, does not mention his return to Judaism, and no Rabbinite mentions his conversion to Christianity. His conversion to Christianity can hardly be reconciled with the fact that he is cited by Baḥya, by Jedaiah Bedersi (in Iggeret Hitnaẓẓelut), and by Moses ibn Ezra. Ḳirḳisani mentions two other books by David: Kitab al-Khaliḳah, a commentary on Genesis extracted from Christian exegetical works; and a commentary on Ecclesiastes. He is incorrectly mentioned as a learned Karaite by David al-Hiti in his chronicle of Karaite doctors, published by Margoliouth (Jew. Quart. Rev. ix.432).

20 Chapters on Philosophy
In 1898 Harkavy discovered in the Imperial Library of St. Petersburg fifteen of the twenty chapters of David's philosophical work entitled Ishrun Maḳalat (Twenty Chapters). The subject-matter of these fifteen chapters is as follows:

 The Aristotelian categories
 Science and the reality of its existence
 The creation of the world
 The evidence that it is composed of substance and accidents
 The properties of substance and accident
 A criticism of those who maintain the eternity of matter
 Arguments in favor of the existence of God and His creation of the world
 The unity of God, refuting the Sabians, the Dualists, and the Christians
 The divine attributes
 Refutation of anthropomorphism and Christian ideas
 Why God became our Lord
 Showing that God created us for good and not for evil, and combating absolute pessimism as well as absolute optimism
 The utility of prophecy and prophets
 Signs of true prophecy and true prophets
 Mandatory and prohibitive commandments.

David as well as other Karaites—for instance, Joseph al-Basir and Al-Ḳirḳisani—was a follower of the Motazilite kalam, especially in his chapter on the attributes of God, wherein he holds that, though we speak of these attributes as we speak of human attributes, the two can not be compared, since nothing comes to Him through the senses as is the case with man. God's "life" is a part of His "being", and the assumption of attributes in the Deity can in no way affect His unity. "Quality" can not be posited of the Deity. In his tenth chapter, on "Rewards and Punishments," David holds that these are eternal in the future world. This chapter has many points in common with Saadia, both drawing from the same source (Schreiner, Der Kalam, p. 25).

Other works 
David quotes two others of his own works which are no longer in existence: Kitab fi al-Budud and Kitab fi 'Arḍ al-Maḳalat 'ala al-Manṭiḳ, on the categories. In one passage David relates that he had a philosophical disputation in Damascus with a Muslim scholar, Shabib al-Baṣri. A fragment of another work, Kitab al-Tauḥid, Book on the Unity (of God), has been discovered among genizah fragments, and has been published by E. N. Adler and I. Broydé in Jew. Quart Rev. (xiii.52 et seq.). David does not betray his Jewish origin in his philosophical work. Contrary to the practice of Saadia, Bahya, and other Jewish philosophers, he never quotes the Bible, but cites Greek and Arabic authorities. It is possible that this accounts for the neglect of his work by the Jews.

Jewish Encyclopedia bibliography 
Fürst, in Literaturblatt des Orients, viii.617, 642;
Gabriel Polak, Halikot Ḳedem, pp. 69 et seq.;
Pinsker, Liḳḳuṭe Ḳadmoniyyot, ii.17 et seq.;
Grätz, Gesch. v.285;
A. Harkavy, Le-Ḳorot ha-Kittot be-Yisrael', in Grätz, Gesch. iii.498 et seq. (Hebr. transl.);
idem, in Voskhod, Sept., 1898;
Samuel Poznanski, in Jew. Quart. Rev. xiii.328;
Steinschneider, in Jew. Quart. Rev. xi.606, xiii.450;
idem, Hebr. Uebers. p. 378;
David Kaufmann, Attributenlehre, Index, passim.

 Recent Bibliography 
 Sarah Stroumsa, Dawud ibn Marwan al-Muqammis's 'Ishrun Maqala'' (Etudes sur le judaisme medieval XIII, Leiden: Brill, 1989)

References

930s deaths
Year of birth unknown
Year of death uncertain
Philosophers of Judaism
10th-century Abbasid rabbis
9th-century Abbasid rabbis
Converts to Christianity from Judaism
Converts to Judaism from Christianity
Critics of Christianity
9th-century Arabic writers
10th-century Arabic writers
People from Raqqa Governorate